Watgal also spelled as Vatagal is a village near Kavital in the Manvi taluk of Raichur district in the Indian state of Karnataka. Watgal is the location of a pre-historic period site. Baswanna Tempal Neolithic grey ware of Brahmagiri fabric and Jorwe fabric has been excavated in the village. Watgal is lies between Kavital and Lingasugur.

Excavation 
Excavation at Watgal was led by a collaborative team of archaeologists from the U.S. and the government of Karnataka. Surface studies and excavations produced black and red ware and pottery dating as far back as pre-historical times. Additionally, there were handmade red and grey wares, predominantly bowls and jars. Three burials were found, two infants and one adult. One infant was wrapped in a white fibrous material while the other was placed in two dull red wares. The adult had no associated artifacts.

See also
 Maski
 Hatti
 Mudgal
 Jaladurga
 Raichur
 Districts of Karnataka

References

External links

Villages in Raichur district
Archaeological sites in Karnataka